The 2015 Canada Open Grand Prix was the eighth grand prix and grand prix gold tournament of the 2015 BWF Grand Prix and Grand Prix Gold. The tournament was held at the Markin MacPhail Centre in Calgary, Canada June 23 until June 28, 2015 and had a total purse of $50,000.

Players by nation

Men's singles

Seeds

  Marc Zwiebler (semi-final)
  Xue Song (quarter-final)
  Hsu Jen-hao (quarter-final)
  Dionysius Hayom Rumbaka (withdrew)
  Wong Wing Ki (third round)
  Takuma Ueda (semi-final)
  Ng Ka Long (final)
  Chong Wei Feng (first round)
  Ajay Jayaram (quarter-final)
  Sai Praneeth (quarter-final)
  Anand Pawar (third round)
  Osleni Guerrero (second round)
  Wang Tzu-wei (first round)
  Lee Chong Wei (champion)
  Joachim Persson (third round)
  Thomas Rouxel (third round)

Finals

Top half

Section 1

Section 2

Section 3

Section 4

Bottom half

Section 5

Section 6

Section 7

Section 8

Women's singles

Seeds

  Akane Yamaguchi (withdrew)
  Zhang Beiwen (second round)
  Michelle Li (champion)
  Sayaka Takahashi (semi-final)
  Minatsu Mitani (semi-final)
  Beatriz Corrales (second round)
  Pai Yu-po (quarter-final)
  Sayaka Sato (second round)

Finals

Top half

Section 1

Section 2

Bottom half

Section 3

Section 4

Men's doubles

Seeds

  Andrei Adistia / Hendra Aprida Gunawan (semi-final)
  Adam Cwalina / Przemysław Wacha (second round)
  Michael Fuchs / Johannes Schottler (second round)
  Manu Attri / Sumeeth Reddy Buss (second round)
  Li Junhui / Liu Yuchen (champion)
  Phillip Chew / Sattawat Pongnairat (first round)
  Baptiste Careme / Ronan Labar (second round)
  Andrew Ellis / Peter Mills (second round)

Finals

Top half

Section 1

Section 2

Bottom half

Section 3

Section 4

Women's doubles

Seeds

  Eefje Muskens / Selena Piek (final)
  Shizuka Matsuo / Mami Naito (quarter-final)
  Jwala Gutta / Ashwini Ponnappa (champion)
  Johanna Goliszewski / Carla Nelte (second round)

Finals

Top half

Section 1

Section 2

Bottom half

Section 3

Section 4

Mixed doubles

Seeds

  Michael Fuchs / Birgit Michels (semi-final)
  Lee Chun Hei / Chau Hoi Wah (champion)
  Jacco Arends / Selena Piek (semi-final)
  Chan Yun Lung / Tse Ying Suet (second round)
  Jorrit de Ruiter / Samantha Barning (quarter-final)
  Phillip Chew / Jamie Subandhi (first round)
  Toby Ng / Alex Bruce (second round)
  Fran Kurniawan / Komala Dewi (first round)

Finals

Top half

Section 1

Section 2

Bottom half

Section 3

Section 4

References

Canadian Open (badminton)
BWF Grand Prix Gold and Grand Prix
Canada Open Grand Prix
Canada Open Grand Prix
Sport in Vancouver